Carlos dos Reis Filho (born 20 August 1906, date of death unknown) was a Brazilian hurdler. He competed in the men's 400 metres hurdles at the 1932 Summer Olympics.

References

 
1906 births
Year of death missing
Athletes (track and field) at the 1932 Summer Olympics
Brazilian male hurdlers
Olympic athletes of Brazil
Place of birth missing